Guillaume Joli (born 27 March 1985) is a former French handballer. He was at the France men's national handball team which won gold medals at the 2009, 2011 and 2015 World Men's Handball Championships and the 2012 Summer Olympics.

References

French male handball players
Sportspeople from Lyon
1985 births
Living people
Liga ASOBAL players
HSG Wetzlar players
Handball players at the 2012 Summer Olympics
Olympic handball players of France
Olympic gold medalists for France
Olympic medalists in handball
Medalists at the 2012 Summer Olympics
European champions for France
21st-century French people